Edoardo Sanguineti (9 December 1930 – 18 May 2010) was a Genoese poet, writer and academic, universally considered one of the major Italian authors of the second half of the twentieth century.

Biography
During the 1960s he was a leader of the neo avant-garde Gruppo 63 movement, founded in 1963 at Solunto.

He was also an active translator of Joyce, Molière, Shakespeare, Bertolt Brecht, and select Greek and Latin authors.

From 1979 until 1983, Sanguineti was a member of the Chamber of Deputies of the Italian Parliament. He was elected as an independent on the list of the PCI.

He was an atheist.

Death
Sanguineti died on 18 May 2010 at Villa Scassi Hospital in Genoa following emergency surgery for an abdominal aneurysm. He was 79.

Works
Capriccio italiano, Feltrinelli, Milano, 1963
Il Giuoco dell'Oca, Feltrinelli, Milano, 1967
Laborintus, Magenta, Varese, 1956
Opus metricum, Rusconi e Paolazzi, Milano, 1960 (contains Laborintus ed Erotopaegnia)
Triperuno, Feltrinelli, Milano, 1964 (contains Opus metricum e Purgatorio de l'Inferno)
Natural Stories # 1 (Drama Series 16), Guernica, Toronto, 1998. Translated from: Storie Naturali #1, Feltrinelli, Milano, 1971.
Re-spira (Breathe) poem for Antonio Papasso, 1983, MoMA, New York City 
Il colore è mio - Antonio Papasso -Retrospettiva 1999, Palazzo Comunale di Bracciano. 
Il Sonetto del foglio Volante, poem for Antonio Papasso, 2006 - Italian Air Force Museum, Vigna di Valle

Translations
J. Joyce, Poesie, Mondadori, Milano, 1961

References

1930 births
2010 deaths
Gruppo 63
Italian atheists
Italian male writers
Writers from Genoa
Struga Poetry Evenings Golden Wreath laureates